Tasos Vasiliou (4 August 1938 – 30 September 2018) was a Greek professional footballer who played as a center back. His nickname was the "Rock" or the "Lion".

Club career
Vasiliou started football from the streets of his neighborhood, at the club of Atlantida. In 1953 he moved to Aris Nikaias and in 1956 he signed to Aris Piraeus. In 1958 he was transferred to Apollon Athens, where he stood out with his talent, as a result of which in 1965 he got the big transfer for AEK, with the huge at the time fee of 1.5 million drachmas.

Vasiliou impressed with his performances for four years and was a very important member of the team, while he also became an international. In 1966, he won the Greek Cup with AEK. In fact, under Jenő Csaknády, he also won the championship in 1968. However, his last two years in the team were a nightmare. Coming from "left-wing" family, he asked the then coach of the national team, Lakis Petropoulos to stop calling him to the reprisentative group, as a sign of protest against the exile his father had suffered in Gyaros from the dictatorial government. Since then, the junta exerted pressure to keep the player out of the competitive activities of the club. With AEK he won 2 Championships, 2 Cups and was a member of the squad that reached the Balkans Cup final in 1967, as well as the quarter-finals of the European Cup in 1969.

In 1970 Vasiliou left the club and initially agreed with Vyzas Megara, but when his fellow townspeople in Nikaia found out about the deal, they pressured him to cancel the transfer and move to Ionikos, which he eventually did. He continued at Ionikos until 1973 when he ended his career. In fact, towards the end of his tenure at Ionikos, he was also the team's coach.

International career
Vasiliou played a total of 10 times with Greece, between 1960 and 1966. He made his debut on 20 November 1960 in a home match against West Germany, as part of the 1962 FIFA World Cup qualifiers, under Tryfon Tzanetis.

After football
Vasiliou, after the end of his career, created a sausage production business that started in Nikaia and then created facilities based in Corinth. He died on September 30, 2018.

Honours

AEK Athens
Alpha Ethniki: 1967–68
Greek Cup: 1965–66

References

External links

1938 births
2018 deaths
Greek footballers
Apollon Smyrnis F.C. players
AEK Athens F.C. players
Ionikos F.C. players
Greece international footballers
Footballers from Piraeus
Association football defenders